Rhodovulum sulfidophilum is a gram-negative purple nonsulfur bacteria. The cells are rod-shaped, and range in size from 0.6 to 0.9 μm wide and 0.9 to 2.0 μm long, and have a polar flagella. These cells reproduce asexually by binary fission. This bacterium can grow anaerobically (photoautotrophic or photoheterotrophic) when light is present, or aerobically (chemoheterotrophic) under dark conditions. It contains the photosynthetic pigments bacteriochlorophyll a and of carotenoids.

There is interest in R. sulfidophilum for its applications in producing artificial spider silk, and for its use in aquaculture for its antiviral properties and as probiotics.

Taxonomy 
R. sulfidophilum was first reported by Hansen and Veldkamp in 1973, and given the name Rhodopseudomonas sulfidophila. The bacterium was later reclassified to the Rhodovulum genus in 1994 by Hiraishi and Ueda.

Metabolism 
When provided with a light source and dinitrogen, using either malate as a carbon source or sulfide as an electron source, it can undergo photosynthesis to produce ATP. R. sulfidophilum is capable of oxidizing sulfide or thiosulfate to yield sulfates in the ecosystem without accumulating intermediates and to have an unusual tri-heme cytochrome subunit bound to the reaction center. Oxidation of thiosulfate is done by the SoxAX protein, which is a heterodimeric c-type cytochrome.
Additionally, unlike other nonsulfur purple bacteria, Rhodovulum sulfidophilum is able to synthesize the peripheral antenna complex even under fully aerobic conditions in the dark. It grows photolithoautotrophically as well as heterotrophically on a wide range of organic compounds.

Multiple strains of R. sulfidophilum have also been shown to be capable of photoferrotrophy, a process that fixes inorganic carbon to organic material using light and Fe(II) as the electron donor. R. sulfidophilum DSM 2351 is the nonsulfur photosynthetic bacterium that efficiently releases nucleic acids into the extracellular milieu. Specifically, this bacterium releases intracellular macromolecules, such as DNA and RNA, into the extracellular milieu, leading to the formation of cell aggregates, a process known as flocculation.

Habitat

Climate and distribution
R.sulfidophilum has been found in a variety of aquatic environments, including freshwater and marine habitats. Rhodovulum sulfidophilum was originally isolated from the mud of the marine floor of the intertidal fiats of the Dutch Waddenzee, north of the province of Groningen, Netherlands. One study discovered this species of bacteria to be abundant in the sediment surface layer of a freshwater pond, another isolated it from a marine shrimp farm, while a different study found it in seashore sediment samples from Osaka Bay. It has been discovered to optimally grow at a temperature range of 30-35 °C and at a pH of around 7.0. Anaerobic conditions are necessary for Rhodovulum sulfidophilum's growth and to use a variety of organic compounds such as lactic, butyric, and acetic acid as carbon and energy sources in low oxygen conditions with available light. It can also utilize bacteriochlorophyll a and sulfur oxidation to conduct photosynthesis as an adaptation to survive in anaerobic climates with high sulfide concentrations.

Altogether, Rhodovulum sulfidophilum appears to have a relatively wide distribution and is found in a variety of aquatic habitats, especially anaerobic environments with high sulfide concentrations.

Growth density 
The growth density of R.sulfidophilum could shift depending on physical variables (e.g. temperature, pH and nutrient availability) that may limit growth.Similar to other bacterial species, cell density is the preferred unit for measuring growth for Rhodovulum sulfidophilum and can be quantified using cell counting or optical density (OD) measurements. 

Additionally, growth density of Rhodovulum sulfidophilum can also be influenced by factors such as competition with other microorganisms, predation by bacteriophages, and environmental stressors, which may limit its growth and density in certain conditions.

Conservation concerns 
Rhodovulum sulfidophilum has not been considered a species of conservation concern, but it remains subject to similar environmental stresses and threats that potentially impact other microorganisms within their own respective habitats.

One of the primary threats that could potentially impact the survival rate of Rhodovulum sulfidophilum would be global warming  Climate change impacts many important physical factors that limit growth such as temperature and ocean acidification. When these physical growth conditions shift, the abundance and distribution of microorganisms within the aquatic environment could change, including R.sulfidophilum. 

Another threat towards the conservation of R.sulfidophilum could be the pollution and degradation of its environment. Factors such as temperature shifts, changes in water quality, and shifts in nutrient availability would be expected to impact its survival and growth. This is due to the negative impact of anthropogenic activities such as urbanization, agricultural practices, and industrial development pollution on microbial habitats.

Applications

Genetic engineering to produce spider silk 

Spider silk is low weight biodegradable material with high elasticity. This confers mechanical and tensile strength, allowing it to be well-suited for sustainable and biomedical uses. However, due to the cannibalistic nature of spiders and low silk potential in spider glands, silk yields are low. Genetic approaches to increase silk production yields have been attempted. For instance, the required spider genes have been successfully recombined in organisms ranging from bacteria (E.coli) to animals (mice). Nevertheless, these heterotrophic microbial cell factories are unsustainable and costly due to the high metabolic demands for organic materials. In 2020, a research team in Japan identified R.sulfidophilum as a sustainable and low cost silk producing microbial cell factory. Genetically modified R.sulfidophilum can produce the hydrophobic repetitive sequence of Major ampullate spidroin (MaSp), the major protein in spider silk. After constructing a plasmid containing the necessary genetic information for the MaSp1 gene, researchers conjugated the plasmid into R.sulfidophilum and observed gene expression and spider silk fibre formation in heterotrophic and autotrophic growth conditions. Notably, as a photoautotroph, the marine bacteria uses low-cost, abundant and renewable resources to make the silk: CO2 as a carbon source, light as an energy source and N2 as a nitrogen source. Additionally, its ability to grow in seawater confers a possible reduction of contamination during cultivation. While more work is necessary, R.sulfidophilum proves to be a sustainable, cost-effective photosynthetic microbial cell factory for artificial silk production, with possible applications for other bio-compounds.

Use in aquaculture

Antiviral properties 
Aptamers are short oligonucleotide strands that selectively bind to both viral and host proteins. They are non-immunogenic and can be artificially produced at a low cost, in a quick timeframe. Additionally, through a modified version of SELEX (systematic evolution of ligands by exponential enrichment) that uses entire cells as targets, aptamers are unique as they can select for a specific marker without any prior knowledge of it. This proves to be a favorable feature as it can discovery new biomarkers and surface proteins. Aptamers rival conventional immunotherapeutic antibody production. The main limitation of aptamers are their high susceptibility to degradation, however this can be reduced through chemical modification. Aptamers are used as biosensors to detect diseases and act as therapeutics, such as in fisheries.  Moreover, R.sulfidophilum can produce RNA antiviral aptamers against viral fish infecting viruses, such as hemorrhagic septicemia virus (VHSV) and hirame rhabdovirus. These aptamers have been shown to reduce Japanese flounder mortality from 90% to 10% in 10 days post-infection. R.sulfidophilum’s aptamers have the potential to improve biosecurity in aquaculture and fisheries.

Probiotics

Purple non-sulphur bacteria, such as R.sulfidophilum, have been used in aquaculture as probiotics, which are microorganisms that have health benefits. Kuruma shrimp (Marsupenaeus japonicus) is an important species in the global aquaculture industry, most notably being cultured in Japan and China. Probiotics have been used as an eco-friendly, low-cost approach to boost shrimp immunity by upregulating immunity genes, such as antimicrobial peptides, and moulting-related genes, including cuticle and calcification proteins. R.sulfidophilum can be effective as a probiotic at a low concentration (10^3 cfu/mL) in rearing waters. Additionally, after the addition of R.sulfidophilum various features of shrimp growth are improved: body weight (by 1.76-fold), survival rate (by 8.3%), and the feed conversion ratio (by 10%).  R.sulfidophilum improves shrimp growth and aquaculture.

References

Further reading
DNA hybridisation: 

Nitrogenase activity:

External links
Rhodopseudomonas

Hyphomicrobiales